Fredericia station ( or Fredericia Station) is a railway station serving the city of Fredericia in Jutland, Denmark.

Fredericia station is an important railway junction where the Copenhagen-Fredericia Line, the Fredericia-Aarhus Line, and the Flensburg-Fredericia Line all cross each other. The station was opened in 1935 together with the opening of the Little Belt Bridge across the Little Belt. The train services are operated by the railway company DSB.

History

The current station is the second in Fredericia. It replaced the first station, which was located by the harbour from where there had been a connection via railway ferry across the Little Belt to Strib on the island Funen. The current station was opened in 1935 together with the opening of the Little Belt Bridge across the Little Belt.

Architecture
The second and present station building from 1935 in a functionalist style with a touch of Nordic Classicism was designed by the Danish architect Knud Tanggaard Seest who was the head architect of the Danish State Railways from 1922 to 1949. The station is one of only five in Denmark with a train shed covering the tracks and platforms. The old station at the harbour also had a train shed, which has been demolished.

See also
 List of railway stations in Denmark

Notes

References

Citations

Bibliography

External links

  Banedanmark – government agency responsible for maintenance and traffic control of most of the Danish railway network
  DSB – largest Danish train operating company
  Danske Jernbaner – website with information on railway history in Denmark

Railway stations opened in 1935
Railway stations in the Region of Southern Denmark
Fredericia
Railway stations in Denmark opened in the 20th century